The Order of the National Coat of Arms was instituted by Konstantin Päts on 7 October 1936 to commemorate 24 February 1918, the day on which Estonian independence was declared. The Order of the National Coat of Arms is bestowed only on Estonian citizens, as a decoration of the highest class for services rendered to the state.

Classes
The Order of the National Coat of Arms comprises six classes:
 One special class – the Collar of the Order of the National Coat of Arms;
 Five basic classes – 1st, 2nd, 3rd, 4th and 5th class.

The greater national coat of arms as part of the decorations of all the classes of the Order of the National Coat of Arms, goldplated on both sides, bears on its reverse the embossed date "24. II 1918". The colour tone of the blue moiré ribands belonging to the decorations of all the classes of the Order of the National Coat of Arms is determined according to the international PANTONE colour-table as 285 C.

Collar
The collar of the Order of the National Coat of Arms is a badge of the office of the President of Estonia.  Until 2008, the collar was unique.  As, however, Russians during the Soviet occupation had taken that collar to the Armory Chamber (Оружейная палата, Oruzhejjnaja palata) in the Moscow Kremlin as a trophy and never have returned the collar to Estonia, a newly made copy is again worn by the President of Estonia as a badge of office.

Special sash
Special sash (Riigivapi teenetemärgi erisuurpael) was received by Konstantin Päts after his accession to the post of the President of the Republic.

Gallery

See also
 :Category:Recipients of the Order of the National Coat of Arms
 Estonian State Decorations
 Coat of Arms of Estonia
 State decoration

References

External links

 The Order of the National Coat of Arms at president.ee
 List of recipients

Orders, decorations, and medals of Estonia
Awards established in 1936
1936 establishments in Estonia